Hello My Name Is... is the debut studio album by American singer and songwriter Bridgit Mendler released on October 22, 2012, through Hollywood Records. Mendler began planning the project in 2011 and co-wrote all fifteen of its tracks.

The album debuted at number thirty on the US Billboard 200 and at number 20 on the US Billboard Digital Albums chart with over 12,000 pure album sales. It also charted at number 17 on the Polish Albums Chart, the first country to chart outside the US. The first single of the album, "Ready or Not", premiered on August 3, 2012, and was released as a digital download on August 7, 2012. The song debuted at number 98 and peaked at number 49 on the US Billboard Hot 100 chart.

She has used three more songs to promote her album: "Hurricane", "Top of the World" and the promotional single "Forgot to Laugh". The album received mainly positive reviews from music critics, who praised Mendler's vocals and songwriting skills, but criticized the songs for sounding too alike and lacking direction.

Background, composition and release
Mendler described the album as authorial and pop, with R&B, jazz and funk influences. Mendler originally announced that her album would be released in September 2012. It was also announced that her single, "Ready or Not", would premiere on children's radio on August 3, 2012, be available to purchase on August 7, 2012, and impact top 40 radio on August 20, 2012. The song impacted the mainstream radio on August 21, 2012. The release date of the album was later changed to October 22, 2012. The track listing and album cover were announced on August 20, 2012. The album has an "acoustic, soulful jazzy funky sort of thing." The re-release of the album for Japan features an alternative album cover, and was released on February 17, 2014.

Promotion

On October 19, 2012 Mendler performed "Ready or Not" and "Hurricane" on Off the Charts. On October 20, she performed "Ready or Not" on Radio Disney and Disney Channel show Total Access. On November 14, 2012 Mendler sang "Ready or Not" and "5:15" on Good Morning America on November 14, 2012. Mendler performed the song on Live! with Kelly and Michael on November 15, 2012. The first single also was performed on The X Factor semi-final results show on December 13, 2012. On March 11, 2013 Mendler performed "Hurricane" on Live! with Kelly and Michael. On April 27 Mendler was on 2013 Radio Disney Music Awards and performed "Hurricane". This was the first time in her career that Mendler sang in an award. In Canada Mendler performed the some songs on The Morning Show, on New Music Live in Toronto, Canada and on Disneyland Resort the song was performed on October 12, 2012.

In May she traveled to Argentina to record a cameo appearances in the Latin telenovela show Violetta and sang "Hurricane" with the cast. On May 17 Mendler performed the song on MTV Push. On May 30 the CBBC's show Blue Peter also broadcast a performance previously recorded. On June 5, she performed the song on The Ellen DeGeneres Show after an interview. On June 20 Mendler traveled to the United Kingdom to promote her single on BBC Radio 1. The next day, Mendler performed "Hurricane" on Daybreak and, on June 23, she promoted the song on Sunday Brunch, but didn't sing it. On July 15 Mendler performed it on the FOX morning talk show Good Day L.A. On July 23 Mendler traveled Singapore to promote the song on the radios and, in the same week, went to Australia to perform the song on The Today Show, on July 30, and on NovaFM, 31. Also on July 31, the Grammy Academy released a video of "Hurricane" in an exclusive intimate performance for 'Grammy HQ' with "5:15", "Ready or Not" and an interview.

Tours
To promote the album, Mendler embarked on her debut headlining concert tour entitled Bridgit Mendler: Live in Concert. The tour played 25 shows starting on August 25, 2012 and ended on January 19, 2013. The tour played music festivals and state fairs in the United States and Canada; it became a major success with critics, selling out many dates in the United States. She continued to promote the album with her 2013 Summer Tour. The tour began on June 16, 2013 in Burlington, Iowa and ended on September 21, 2013 in Puyallup, Washington.

VEVO Lift series
In April 2013, Mendler recorded a series of videos at the request of VEVO, from the special VEVO Lift, an intimate acoustic performance recorded in the VEVO Studios and interviews about her debut album. The project was released in twenty three parts in her official channel.

Acoustic performances
"Ready or Not"
"Hurricane"
"5:15"
"Blonde"
"Love Will Tell Us Where to Go"

Singles
"Ready or Not" is the first single from the album. It premiered on August 3, 2012, and was released as a digital download on August 7, 2012. The song was written by Mendler herself, Emanuel "Eman" Kiriakou and Evan "Kidd" Bogart. The song received positive reviews from music critics, praising the song's unique sound and also Mendler's vocals, which have been compared to Carly Rae Jepsen and Demi Lovato. The song debuted at number 98 and peaked at number 49 on the US Billboard Hot 100 chart, number 80 and peaked at number 48 on the Canadian Hot 100 chart, and at number 14 and peaked at number 12 on the US Top Heatseekers chart. It has also debuted at number 17 and peaked at number 12 on the New Zealand Singles Chart, becoming her first Top 20 hit internationally. It has sold 21,000 copies in its first week according to Nielsen SoundScan.

"Hurricane" was previously released as a promotional single to iTunes Store for Single of Week on October 22, 2012. It was later announced to be the second single and was officially released to radio on February 12, 2013. The song received positive reviews from music critics, praising Mendler's vocals and the song's reggae influence. Critics praised heavily on Mendler's rapping skills, which have been compared to Cher Lloyd and Lily Allen. The song debuted at number 194 on the South Korean International Singles Chart, making it the second song to chart in the country.

"Top of the World" was released as third single on July 17, 2013. The song was featured on the twelfth season of American Idol during the "Charlotte Auditions".

Promotional singles
"Forgot to Laugh" was heard on October 4, 2012, via Idolator. It was then placed on Mendler's YouTube page the next day. Even without the song being released as a single, the song already received positive reviews, saying that the song "is a shiny, guitar-driven pop-rock anthem, loaded with witty metaphors that would give Taylor Swift a run for her money." and concluded that "the sharp songcraft is all the more impressive given that Mendler co-wrote the track herself." According to MTV, it was produced by Emanuel "Eman" Kiriakou and Evan "Kidd" Bogart, the same people who produced "Ready or Not". Rachel Brodsky of MTV was also positive with her review, describing the song as "at once sunny and wise, and seems to revel in the friendly sass and punch of Cher Lloyd and the fast-talking know-how of Lily Allen".

Critical reception

The album has received mostly positive reviews from music critics. Tim Sendra of AllMusic was positive with his review, praising her "fine singing voice" and her "songwriting chops". He comments on some of the songs: "Ready or Not" is the best track by far with a very catchy chorus, "Hurricane" has clever fairy tale lyrics and an impassioned vocal (and a sassy rap section), "Blonde" is a little clichéd but ends up as a convincing argument that hair color isn't a gauge of brains, and "Rocks at My Window" is a witty and fun love song with a big beat. Apart from the very moody and vocally powerful "5:15", the ballads aren't particularly memorable, though, and the album is bogged down by similar-sounding arrangements and song structures that don't do Mendler's voice and breezy style any favors. He concluded the album, saying "Still, it's an impressive debut from a singer who shows real talent and has every chance to break out of the Disney mold and do something all her own down the road." Xinhua of Spin or Bin rated the album 3 out of 5 stars and praised the "catchy tunes" of the songs and her "surprisingly capable vocals" but concluded: "Honestly, with the industry dominated by Taylor Swift, Demi Lovato and Cher Lloyd at the moment, it's really going to be quite hard for a breakout artist to pit herself against the pop princesses, even with a pretty solid album like Hello My Name Is... but I'm really enjoying the songs on here, and will be on the lookout for Bridgit Mendler in the next year or so. She could just surprise us." Jessica Dawson of Common Sense Media gave a positive review of the album and rated it four out of five stars and praised the clean lyrics of the songs. Hailey Sager of Musiqtone gave an acclaimed rating of four-and-a-half stars out of five and praised her "vocal range" and the "powerful and lyrics" of the songs. She concluded that "Mendler has an amazing voice" and that she said that the album "is one of my favorite albums of 2012 because it has a lot of relatable material, and it is also an enjoyable album."

However, hiddentrack of AbsolutePunk gave a mixed review and rated the album 47% out of 100% and was not sure "whether she wants to be the next Taylor Swift or Cher Lloyd or even Kesha." He also said that the album "really lacks any direction at all." But he did praise the lead single, "Ready or Not", describing it as "catchy" with "a big chorus, handclaps and fluffy lyrics that lack substance, but it works." Sherman Yang of MSN also gave a mixed review and gave the album two-and-a-half stars out of five; He praised  "Ready or Not" for its "catchy chorus", and he described it and "Forgot to Laugh" as "fun and happy tracks that kids can party to but with sadly bimbotic lyrics." He also noticed that after listening to the first two tracks, "the tracks start to sound the same after a while with their seemingly similar melodies and arrangements." He concluded that "Mendler either needs to find some inspiration to write better songs or cover other artists' works because her songs sound the same after a while. It seems rather likely at this point that the singer might be headed down the path to nowhere."

Accolades

Commercial performance
The album debuted at number 30 on the US Billboard 200 chart and at number 30 on the US Billboard Digital Albums chart. According to Billboard and Soundscan, the album sold over 12,000 copies in its first week of release.

Track listing

Notes
 denotes a co-producer.
 signifies a remixer.

Sample credits
"Ready or Not" contains the interpolation of "Ready or Not Here I Come (Can't Hide from Love)" by The Delfonics.

Personnel

Musicians
Bridgit Mendler – vocals
Andrew Goldstein – guitars, bass, keyboards, programming, backing vocals 
Emanuel Kiriakou – guitars, bass, ukulele, keyboards, programming, backing vocals 
David Ryan – guitars
Phil Shaouy – guitars
Freddy Wexler – synthesizers
Jai Marlon – synthesizers; string arrangement (track 3)
Donnell Shawn Butler – backing vocals
Spencer Lee – backing vocals
Evan Bogart – backing vocals

Production
Emanual Kiriakou – producer (tracks 1–4, 6–8, 10 and 11)
Andrew Goldstein – producer (tracks 1–4, 6–8, 10 and 11)
Jens Koerkemeier – recording, editing
Pat Thrall – recording and editing assistance (tracks 6–8, 11)
John Hanes – mix engineer
Phil Seaford – assistant mix engineer
Serban Ghenea – mixing
Freddy Wexler – producer, recording (track 5, 12)
Jai Marlon – producer (track 5)
Dan Glashauser – recording (track 5, 12)
Neal H. Pogue – mixing (track 5, 9, 12)
Jeremiah Olvera – mixing  (track 5, 9, 12)
DreamLab – producer (track 9)
Chris Gehringer – mastering

Charts and certifications

Weekly charts

Year-end charts

Certifications

Release history

References

2012 debut albums
Albums produced by Dreamlab
Albums produced by Emanuel Kiriakou
Bridgit Mendler albums
Hollywood Records albums